Lachnocnema disrupta, the toothed white woolly legs, is a butterfly in the family Lycaenidae. It is found in Ivory Coast, Ghana (the Volta Region), eastern Nigeria, Cameroon, the Democratic Republic of the Congo, Uganda, and Zambia.

References

Butterflies described in 1935
Miletinae